Arachania may refer to the following places in Uruguay:

Arachania, Cerro Largo, a village in Cerro Largo Department
Arachania, Rocha, a village in Rocha Department